Mainland Southeast Asia, also known as Indochina or the Indochinese Peninsula, is the continental portion of Southeast Asia. It lies east of the Indian subcontinent and south of Mainland China and is bordered by the Indian Ocean to the west and the Pacific Ocean to the east. It includes the countries of Cambodia, Laos, Myanmar, Thailand, Vietnam, and the peninsular portion of Malaysia.

The term Indochina (originally Indo-China) was coined in the early nineteenth century, emphasizing the historical cultural influence of Indian and Chinese civilizations on the area. The term was later adopted as the name of the colony of French Indochina (today's Cambodia, Laos, and Vietnam). Today, the term, Mainland Southeast Asia, in contrast to Maritime Southeast Asia, is more commonly referenced.

Terminology

Scholarly opinions at the time regarding China's and India's historical influence over the area were conflicting, and the term was itself controversial—Malte-Brun himself later argued against its use in a later edition of his Universal Geography, reasoning that it over-emphasized Chinese influence, and suggested Chin-India instead. Nevertheless, Indo-China had already gained traction and soon supplanted alternative terms such as Further India and the Peninsula beyond the Ganges. Later, however, as the French established the colony of French Indochina, use of the term became more restricted to the French colony, and today the area is usually referred to as Mainland Southeast Asia.

Biogeography
In biogeography, the Indochinese bioregion is a major region in the Indomalayan realm, and also a phytogeographical floristic region in the Oriental Paleotropical Kingdom. It includes the native flora and fauna of all the countries above. The adjacent Malesian Region covers the Maritime Southeast Asian countries, and straddles the Indomalayan and Australasian realms.

Geography 

The Indochinese Peninsula projects southward from the Asian continent proper. It contains several mountain ranges extending from the Tibetan Plateau in the north, interspersed with lowlands largely drained by three major river systems running in a north–south direction: the Irrawaddy (serving Myanmar), the Chao Phraya (in Thailand), and the Mekong (flowing through Northeastern Thailand, Laos, Cambodia and Vietnam). To the south it forms the Malay Peninsula, located on which are Southern Thailand and Peninsular Malaysia; the latter is variably considered part of Mainland Southeast Asia or separately as part of Maritime Southeast Asia.

It is also unclear whether some southern parts of China could also be considered Mainland Southeast Asia, due to proximity to Southeast Asian geography and climate as well as containing many ethnic groups considered Southeast Asian such as Tai peoples who live there. Nonetheless, they are generally not considered a part of South East Asia.

Culture
Mainland Southeast Asia contrasts with Maritime Southeast Asia, mainly through the division of largely land-based lifestyles in Indochina and the sea-based lifestyles of the Indonesian archipelago and Philippine archipelago, as well as the dividing line between the Austroasiatic, Tai–Kadai, and Sino-Tibetan languages (spoken in Mainland Southeast Asia) and the Austronesian languages (spoken in Maritime Southeast Asia). The languages of the mainland form the Mainland Southeast Asia linguistic area: although belonging to several independent language families, they have converged over the course of history and share a number of typological similarities.

The countries of mainland Southeast Asia received cultural influence from both India and China to varying degrees. Some cultures, such as those of Cambodia, Laos, and Thailand are influenced mainly by India with a smaller influence from China. Others, such as Vietnam, are more heavily influenced by Chinese culture with only minor influences from India, largely via the Champa civilization that Vietnam conquered during its southward expansion. Myanmar, on the other hand balances the influence of the two cultures.

Overall, Mainland Southeast Asia is predominantly Buddhist with minority Muslim and Hindu populations.

See also 

 Southeast Asia
 Maritime Southeast Asia

 Related regional concepts
 Mainland Southeast Asia linguistic area
 Southeast Asian Massif
 Zomia

 Sub-regions
 Golden Chersonese
 Golden Triangle
 Greater Mekong Subregion

References

Further reading
 
 History of the mountain people of southern Indochina up to 1945 (Bernard Bourotte, i.e. Jacques Méry, U.S. Agency for International Development, 195? (PDF)

External links 
 

Geography of Southeast Asia
Peninsulas of Asia
Southeast Asian studies
Names of places in Asia
Historical regions
Regions of Eurasia